The Minister is a 2011 French-Belgian political drama film directed by Pierre Schöller.

Plot
French Transport Minister Bertrand Saint-Jean arrives at the scene of a serious bus crash with many fatalities. He later attends a news interview where he is asked about the government's plans to privatize some train stations as part of a budget reform. Bertrand is supposed to be a major facilitator of this reform, but neither he nor his friend and assistant Gilles approve the plan. Popular opinion also disapproves of the privatization.

However, Bertrand doesn't want to oppose the Prime Minister. While his staff oppose the reform, Bertrand hopes the President will provide a watered-down reform to end popular protest. The Prime Minister promises the first step will only consist of five secondary train stations. Bertrand suffers so much from pressure that he has a nightmare in which he commits suicide after reading the five stations are the most prestigious in all of France.

Finally, when Bertrand thought all his staff would abandon him, Gilles ensures him he will stay to help Bertrand negotiate the reform into something acceptable.

In the end, the President intervenes himself to arbitrate. But contrary to Bertrand's hopes, he has no intention of softening the reform. Bertrand  clearly noticed that he has no say in the reform details; his mission is to implement them to the letter while reassuring opponents. Even worse, the Prime Minister and President have already selected a new generation of assistants for Bertrand in this mission, explicitly ordering Gilles to be fired.

Bertrand silently accepts these orders. The film ends as he walks out of the President's office hiding how heartbreaking these orders are.

Cast
 Olivier Gourmet as Bertrand Saint-Jean, Minister of Transport
 Michel Blanc as Gilles
 Zabou Breitman as Pauline
 Sylvain Deblé as Martin Kuypers
 Didier Bezace as Dominique Woessner
 Jacques Boudet as Senator Juillet
 François Chattot as Falconetti, Minister of Health
 Gaëtan Vassart as Loïk
 Arly Jover as Séverine Saint-Jean
 Eric Naggar as the French Prime Minister
 Anne Azoulay as Josepha
 Abdelhafid Metalsi as Louis-Do
 Christian Vautrin as Nemrod
 François Vincentelli as Peralta, Minister of Budget
 Stéphan Wojtowicz as the French President

Accolades
It premiered in the Un Certain Regard section at the 2011 Cannes Film Festival where it won the Un Certain Regard FIPRESCI Award. It received four Magritte Award nominations, winning three, including Best Foreign Film in Coproduction and Best Actor for Olivier Gourmet.

References

External links
 

2011 films
2011 drama films
French political drama films
Belgian drama films
2010s French-language films
2010s political drama films
Films featuring a Best Supporting Actor César Award-winning performance
Magritte Award winners
2010s French films